The District Council of Robertstown was a local government area in South Australia from 1932 to 1997. The central town and council seat was Robertstown.

It was established on 3 May 1932 with the amalgamation of the District Council of Apoinga and the District Council of English. In 1936, it was reported to cover 550 square miles, with a population of 2,100. It comprised the cadastral hundreds of Apoinga, Bower, Bright, Bundey and English. The district's industries were described as "wheat, wool, dairy produce, magnasite, asbestos and...firewood". The council met in the Peace Hall at Robertstown. It was divided into five wards: Apoinga, Bower, Bright, English and Robertstown.

It existed until 1997, when it merged with the District Council of Burra Burra, the District Council of Eudunda and the District Council of Hallett to form the Regional Council of Goyder.

Chairmen
 Johannes Alwin Heinrich (1932–1933) 
 Walter Lewis Noske (1933–1954) 
 Johannes Alwin Heinrich (1954–1955) 
 Angus Hammond Farley (1955–1972) 
 Frank Martin Mosey (1972–1982) 
 Denis Brian Keller (1982–?)

References

Robertstown
Robertstown, District Council of
Robertstown, District Council of